The Museums Association (MA) is a professional membership organisation based in London for museum, gallery and heritage professionals, museums, galleries and heritage organisations, and companies that work in the museum, gallery and heritage sector of the United Kingdom. It also offers international membership.

History
The association was started in 1889 by a small group of museums to protect the interests of museums and galleries. Its inaugural meeting was held at the invitation of the Council of the Yorkshire Philosophical Society in York on 20 June 1889. The MA is the oldest museum association in the world.

Mission
The MA's mission is inspiring museums to change lives. It advocates for museums, sets ethical standards and runs training and professional development for members wishing to further their careers.

Activities
The association organises an annual conference. This is Europe's largest event for museum and heritage professionals.

Members receive the monthly Museums Journal. The MA also produces Museum Practice online. The latest case studies and best practice by museum professionals around the UK, with an interactive platform for users to share their ideas.

Through its work with the Esmee Fairbairn Foundation, the MA has created the Esmee Fairbairn Collections Fund, building on its 2005 report, Collections for the Future.

The MA charts the health of UK museums through its annual survey, Museums in the UK.

In 2012 the MA began its "Museums 2020" project to create a vision for the future of the museum sector. It hopes to focus on the impacts that museums will have in the future on individuals, communities, society, and the environment.

In 2013 the MA produced "Museums Change Lives", its campaigning vision for the future of museums. "Museums Change Lives" explores the impact of museums under three main headings: wellbeing, better places, ideas and people.

The MA's Transformers scheme was piloted in 2014, then rolled out nationally. Transformers is for people in mid-career, supported by any accredited museum (or museum working towards accreditation), looking to change the way they work. Participants are challenged to develop new ways of thinking and supported throughout to engage with experimental ideas, fresh thinking and learning from the experience of experts and innovators.

In 2018, the MA launched Collections 2030, a research project looking at the long-term purpose, use and management of museum collections.

Membership
The MA has over 8,000 individual members, 580 institutional members, and 250 corporate members.

It runs a professional development scheme, with mentoring and regular training events. "AMA" denotes an Associate of the Museums Association. "FMA" denotes a Fellow of the Museums Association.

Governance
The association is independently funded by its membership, and it is governed by a board of trustees, from all parts of the UK museum community, elected by members. In April 2018, Maggie Appleton replaced David Fleming as president; she is also the CEO of the RAF Museum. Previous presidents include David Anderson, Stuart Davies, David Fleming, William Henry Flower, Jane Glaister, Max Hebditch, Charles Saumarez Smith,Virginia Tandy, and Barbara Woroncow.

See also 
 MDA (formerly the Museum Documentation Association)
 British Association of Friends of Museums
 Irish Museums Association

References

Further reading

External links 
 

Museums Association
1889 establishments in the United Kingdom
Organizations established in 1889
Non-profit organisations based in the United Kingdom
Museum-related professional associations
 
History of museums
Museum associations and consortia